Mimica may refer to:
Vatroslav Mimica (1923-2020), Croatian film director and screenwriter
Eugenio Mimica Barassi (1949-2021), Chilean writer
Neven Mimica (born 1953), Croatian politician and diplomat
Vedran Mimica (born 1954), Croatian architect
Sergio Mimica-Gezzan (born 1956), Croatian film and television director
Mimica Pavlović (born 1984), Serbian football defender
Mimica (footballer) (born 1985), Brazilian football centre-back

Mimica - genus of red algae in Solieriaceae family